Darwinia camptostylis  is a plant in the myrtle family Myrtaceae and is endemic to New South Wales and Victoria. It is small shrub with flattened, glabrous leaves and small clusters of green to yellow flowers. There are scattered populations in coastal areas where the plants grow in heath.

Description
The leaves are crowded near the ends of the branches and are flattened or triangular in cross section.

When they open, the flowers are tubular in shape, surrounded by leaf-like bracts and two lance-shaped, yellowish-green bracteoles which fall off as the flowers mature. Flowering usually occurs between August and November and is followed by the fruit which is a small, non-fleshy nut.

Taxonomy
The first formal description of Darwinia camptostylis was by Barbara Briggs and the description was published in 1962 in Contributions from the New South Wales National Herbarium.

Distribution and habitat
This darwinia occurs in coastal areas of southern New South Wales and far eastern Victoria where it grows in heath or heathy woodland.

Conservation
Darwinia camptostylis is classified as rare in Victoria.

References

 Darwinia camptostylis B.G.Briggs Catalogue of Life: 26 August 2016

Flora of New South Wales
Flora of Victoria (Australia)
Myrtales of Australia
camptostylis
Plants described in 1962
Taxa named by Barbara G. Briggs